Kovčice is a small village in the Municipality of Hrpelje-Kozina in the Littoral region of Slovenia.

The local church, built on a hill above the settlement, is dedicated to Saint Stephen and belongs to the Parish of Slivje.

References

External links
Kovčice on Geopedia

Populated places in the Municipality of Hrpelje-Kozina